Mezerana is a town and commune in Médéa Province, Algeria. According to the 2013 census it has a population of 6,202. The town has a Mediterranean climate and the most commonly used language is Arabic.

References

Communes of Médéa Province